Shel or SHEL may refer to:

 Shel, a male given name
 SHEL, an American folk/pop band